August Yost (years of birth and death unknown) was a professional baseball pitcher. He appeared in one game in Major League Baseball the Chicago Colts on June 12, 1893. He pitched 2.2 innings, facing 19 batters and taking the loss.

External links

Major League Baseball pitchers
Chicago Colts players
Year of death missing
19th-century baseball players
19th-century births